Sheffield City Hall is a Grade II* listed building in Sheffield, England in Barker's Pool, one of the city's central squares. It was built and is owned by Sheffield City Council but is now managed by the Sheffield City Trust, under a 99-year lease and is operated by Sheffield International Venues as a venue for concerts and other events in its various rooms.

History
The building was designed in 1920 by E. Vincent Harris but construction was delayed for 8 years because of the economic climate in the early 1920s. Eventually construction began with the laying of the foundation stone on 27 June 1929 and, after the works has been undertaken by the local contractor, George Longden & Son, the City Hall was officially opened on 22 September 1932. It was originally proposed in 1916 as a Memorial Hall to commemorate the dead of the Great War, but by the time of completion the name had changed to Sheffield City Hall, after some years of controversy.

During the Second World War, a bomb exploded in Barkers Pool, damaging the building's pillars. The scars of the explosion can still be seen. In 2005, the City Hall and its surroundings were refurbished and re-developed at a cost of £12.5 million.

Concerts and Performers
Performers at the City hall included the American singer/pianist Nat King Cole in April 1954 and the American singer/trumpeter, Louis Armstrong in March 1959. the Beatles performed in March/May 1963 and November 1964. 

Other performers have included the progressive rock band, The Nice, in 1969, the singer/pianist/composer, Elton John, in December 1971, the rock band Bon Jovi in November 1986, the electronic band Kraftwerk in July 1991, the singer, Kylie Minogue, in November 1991 and the mezzo-soprano, Katherine Jenkins in January 2012.

Other Events
In June 1934, Oswald Mosley and the British Union of Fascists held a rally in the Hall, while Winston Churchill was awarded the Freedom of the City at the same venue in April 1951.

Architecture and features
It is a building in the neo-classical style with a giant portico. The Oval Hall is the largest hall in the building, seating 2,271 people. The Grand Willis III Organ is the largest in Sheffield with over 4,037 pipes, 75 stops and four manuals. The organ sits in a chamber situated behind the large decorative grilles facing the audience. In addition to the Oval Hall, facilities include the Memorial Hall with capacity to seat 425 people and the Ballroom with capacity to seat 400 people.

A pair of four-foot high stone Art Deco lions, designed by John Hodge and each weighing 2.5 tonnes, stood at either side of the stage when the main hall first opened in 1932. They were removed in 1962 as part of a refurbishment of the City Hall, apparently because the conductor Sir Thomas Beecham, found them distracting. They were acquired by Tarmac Group for use at their offices at John Hadfield House in Matlock and later removed to their offices in Ettingshall (a district of Wolverhampton) in 1997 before being returned to the foyer of the City Hall, as part of the building's 85th anniversary celebrations, in October 2017.

References

Further reading

Anderson, Neil (2012) Sheffield City Hall – 1932–2012 ACM Retro 

City Hall
City Hall
Government buildings completed in 1934
C
Exhibition and conference centres in England
Buildings by Vincent Harris
1934 establishments in England